Alexander Carragh MacDonald of Glenarm was a son of James MacDonald, 6th of Dunnyveg and Agnes Campbell, daughter of Colin Campbell, 3rd Earl of Argyll. Alexander, obtained possession of the barony of Glenarm. He was killed 
along with his brother, Donald Gorm, during the Battle of Ardnaree, Ireland in 1586 against the English.

Family
Alexander had issue:
Ranald, who had issue; Archibald, who was killed at Broughbuy, Glenarm.

References
p379, Rev. A. MacDonald & Rev. A. MacDonald; The Clan Donald

1586 deaths
Alexander
Alexander
Year of birth unknown